"" is the regional anthem of American Samoa. Composed by Napoleon Andrew Tuiteleleapaga and written by Mariota Tiumalu Tuiasosopo, it was officially adopted in 1950.

Lyrics

Notes

References

American Samoan music
Politics of American Samoa
Anthems of insular areas of the United States
Oceanian anthems
1950 establishments in American Samoa
National anthem compositions in A-flat major